Kaifi (born Kifayat Hussain Bhatti; 13 March 1943, Gujrat – 13 March 2009, Lahore) was the younger brother of the legendary Punjabi singer and actor Inayat Hussain Bhatti. Both brothers worked with each other to make some highly successful films in Pakistan. Kaifee himself was a film actor and a film director.

Career
His first film as an independent film director was Muonh Zor (1966), which was a silver jubilee hit film, while his second film Chann Makhna (1968) became a super hit golden jubilee film. In the same year, he introduced himself as a film hero in film Sajjan Pyara (1968). His third film was Jind Jan (1969). Ishq Deevana (1971) was another golden jubilee film and his film Zulm da Badla (1972) celebrated diamond jubilee. Raju Rocket Jagga Gujjar Ultimatom Roti Kapra Aur Insan Erada Challenge Bikray Moti Mele Ga Zulam Da Badla are some of his hit films.

Personal life
Kaifee was married to  film actress Ghazala in the 1970s, and their son Amir  Kaifee became an actor, and later to actress Chakori they sons Hasan Ali Kaifee and Asad Ali Kaifee both are in showbiz  He died on his birthday on 13 March 2009 at age 66.

Partial filmography
Kaifee directed 35 films and acted in almost 100 films. Only two of his films as director were in Urdu language, Bikhray Moti (1975) and Roti, Kapra aur Insaan (1977).  His last film as director was Maidan in 2004.

 Muon Zor (1966) - His debut as a film director
 Sajjan Pyara (1968)
 Chann Makhna (1968) - A 'Golden Jubilee' super-hit film of 1968
 Jind Jan (1969)
 Dunia Matlab Di (1970)
 Sajjan Beli (1970)
 Qadra (1970)
 Wehshi (1971)
 Ishq Deevana (1971)
 Pyar De Pulakay (1971)
 Souch Souda (1971)
 Je O Jata (1971)
 Bazi Jit Lai(1971)
 Puttar Hattan Tay Nai Wikde 
 Koun Dillan Deya Jane (1972)
 Dil Nal Sajan De (1972)
 Zulm Da Badla (1972)
 Sajjan Dushman (1972)
 Ik Dhee Punjab Di(1973)
 Ghairt Da Parchwan(1973)
 Jaib Katra (1973)
 Challenge (1974)
 Dharti De Lal (1974)
 Budda Sher (1974)
 Hasde Aao Hasde Jao (1974)
 Ghairt Jo Sawal (1974) Sindhi film 
 Bikray Moti (1975)
 Peshwar Badmash (1975)
 Rabb Da Roop guest (1975)
 Ultimatum (1976)
 Jagga Gujjar (1976)
 Dankay Di Choat (1976)
 Shehzor(1976)
 Mafroor (1976)
 Roti Kapra Aur Insan (1977)
 Sadkay Teri Mout Toon (1977)
 Himmat (1977)
 Koun Sharif Koun Badmash (1977)
 Erada  (1978)
 Raju Rocket (1978)
 Elan (1978)
 Dangal (1979)
 Waqat Da Badmash (1979)
 Order (1979)
 Deashat (1979)
 Maula Jat (1979)
 Badmashi Band (1980)
 Jeero Badnam (1980)
 Wadda Thanedar (1980)
 Lahoo Day Rishtay (1980)
 Mele Ga Zulam Da Badla (1981)
 Jeedar (1981)
 Je o Shera (1981)
 Athara Tay Jeedar (1981)
 Maula Jatt in London (1981)
 Ik Ziddi Veer (1982)
 Akhari Dushman (1983)
 Taqat (1984)
 Bala Gadi (1984)
 Shah behram (1985)
 Dushmani Jut Di (1986)
 Qashi Puttar (1986)
 Gernail Singh (1987)
 Haq Sach (1987)
 Ishq Rog (1989)
 Meri Hath Jori(1989) (last film as hero)

References

External links
Filmography of Kaifee on Complete Index To World Film (CITWF) website
Filmography of Kifayat Hussain Bhatti (nickname:Kaifee) on IMDb website

1943 births
2009 deaths
Punjabi people
Pakistani male film actors
Pakistani film directors